Celmisia haastii (Haast's mountain daisy) is a perennial alpine plant species of the family Asteraceae, native to New Zealand.

The larvae of the moth Stigmella childi feed on the leaves of this plant.

References

haastii
Endemic flora of New Zealand
Flora of Australasia
Plants described in 1864